Sultan-ul-Arifeen is an Arabic word/title which literally means "the king among those who have Knowledge (of God)" (that is, metaphorically, "the first among the Wise") and may refer to:

Bayazid Bastami (804–874), Persian Sufi mystic, born in Bastam, Greater Iran
Hamza Makhdoom (1494–1576), Sufi mystic, scholar and spiritual teacher living in Kashmir
Sultan Bahoo (1630–1691), Sufi mystic, poet and scholar living in Punjab, founder of the Sarwari Qadiri tradition